Gerry Lynn (24 August 1955 – 11 June 1992) was an Australian rules footballer who played with Hawthorn in the Victorian Football League (VFL).

A rover from Warragul, Lynn made his league debut in round 11 of the 1974 VFL season, against North Melbourne at Arden Street and made his only other appearance of the year four weeks later at Princes Park in a win over South Melbourne. In 1975 and 1976 he broke into the seniors just once, with a strong Hawthorn team making the grand final in both seasons. He polled the second most votes in the 1975 Gardiner Medal.

In 1992 Lynn was killed, along with four others, when the single-engine Piper Cherokee he was traveling in crash into a farm at the Victorian town of Moormbool West. He had been flying to a harness-racing meeting at Ouyen.

References

1955 births
1992 deaths
Hawthorn Football Club players
Frankston Football Club players
Warragul Football Club players
Australian rules footballers from Victoria (Australia)
Accidental deaths in Victoria (Australia)
Victims of aviation accidents or incidents in Australia
Victims of aviation accidents or incidents in 1992